Rinus Bennaars (14 October 1931 – 8 November 2021) was a Dutch professional footballer who was played as a midfielder.

Club career
Bennaars started his career at the time that professional football in the Netherlands did not yet exist. At the time of the first professional football in the country Bennaars and SV DOSKO started in the Dutch Second Division. After three years of professional football at DOSKO Bennaars switched to NOAD, where he stayed one season before making another switch, towards Feijenoord. At his second season at Feijenoord Bennaars won his first trophy when the club won the Eredivisie. They retained their title in the following season and Bennaars was invited to join the Netherlands national team again, nine years after his last call-up. He left Feijenoord after five seasons and went to play another two years in the Second Division at DFC, where he won the championship of that division in his first season. After his second season at the club Bennaars retired from professional football.

International career
On 25 November 1951, when playing for DOSKO, Bennaars played his first match for the Netherlands national team in Rotterdam versus Belgium. The Netherlands lost the match 7–6, but Bennaars managed to score one of the Dutch goals. Until 19 May 1954 he played ten times for the national team. In 1963, he played in another five matches, bringing his total caps to 15. He played one match at the 1952 Summer Olympics.

Personal life
At the time of his retirement, Bennaars worked for the Dutch Railways. He and his wife Corry lost two daughters in infancy and his wife died of Parkinson's disease in 2005. Bennaars died in his home-town Bergen op Zoom on 8 November 2021, at the age of 90.

References

External links
 
 Profile

1931 births
2021 deaths
Sportspeople from Bergen op Zoom
Dutch footballers
Association football midfielders
Netherlands international footballers
Olympic footballers of the Netherlands
Footballers at the 1952 Summer Olympics
Eredivisie players
DOSKO players
NAC Breda players
Feyenoord players
FC Dordrecht players
Footballers from North Brabant